Qwote is a Haitian American singer, rapper, and songwriter.

Career
Qwote was born in Haiti and was raised by his grandmother in the United States. He started to write music at age 12. Residing at various times in Long Island, New York City, he later on moved to Miami, where he found his niche in the Miami clubs. He had his first big break appearing on rap artist Trina's 2008 album Still da Baddest on the song "Phone Sexx". He was featured alongside Pitbull on a minor hit in Austria called "Superstar" by Jump Smokers. His 2009 song "Don't Wanna Fight" featuring Trina became a hit in New Zealand. He recorded a rearranged version of the same song with Shaggy and a second one with Pitbull. He also recorded "Shawty It's Your Booty".

In 2011, Qwote recorded a version of Lucenzo's "Vem Dançar Kuduro" titled "Throw Your Hands Up (Dançar Kuduro)". This version is credited to Qwote featuring Pitbull and Lucenzo. It entered the UK Singles Chart straight in at No. 13 in its first week of release.

Discography

Mixtapes

Singles

As lead artist

As featured artist

Other charted songs

References

External links
Official website
Slip-N-Slide page
Facebook
Myspace
YouTube
Twitter
LastFM

Living people
21st-century Haitian male singers
21st-century American male singers
21st-century American singers
Haitian emigrants to the United States
Year of birth missing (living people)